Synechodes sidereus is a moth in the family Brachodidae. It was described by Kallies in 2004. It is found in New Guinea.

The wingspan is about 21 mm. The forewings are brownish black, but lighter in the anterior third. There is a small yellow spot near the base. The forewings are covered with white scales. The hindwings are black, with a large orange-yellow spot.

Etymology
The species name refers to the forewing pattern, which resembles a starry sky and is derived from sidereus (meaning starry).

References

Natural History Museum Lepidoptera generic names catalog

Brachodidae
Moths described in 2004